Reginald Lee Harris (1890–1959) was a North Carolina politician who served as Speaker of the North Carolina House of Representatives in 1933 and as the 19th Lieutenant Governor of North Carolina from 1941 to 1945 serving under Governor J. Melville Broughton. A Democrat, Harris lived in Roxboro, North Carolina.

References
OurCampaigns.com
Rootsweb

1890 births
1959 deaths
Lieutenant Governors of North Carolina
Members of the North Carolina House of Representatives
People from Roxboro, North Carolina
Speakers of the North Carolina House of Representatives
20th-century American politicians